Luis Lobo and Javier Sánchez were the defending champions but lost in the quarterfinals to Trevor Kronemann and David Macpherson.

Jiří Novák and Pavel Vízner won in the final 4–6, 7–6, 7–6 against Kronemann and Macpherson.

Seeds
Champion seeds are indicated in bold text while text in italics indicates the round in which those seeds were eliminated.

  Guy Forget /  Jakob Hlasek (first round)
  Yevgeny Kafelnikov /  Menno Oosting (first round)
  Luis Lobo /  Javier Sánchez (quarterfinals)
  Libor Pimek /  Byron Talbot (first round)

Draw

References
 1996 Rado Open Doubles Draw

Swiss Open (tennis)
1996 ATP Tour
Swiss Open